Ansing is a village in Washim district in Maharashtra, India.

Demographics
As of the 2011 census, there were 11,809 people, of which 6,122 were male and 5,687 were female. 1,579 people were children aged 0–6. The average sex ratio was 929, which is equal to the state average. However, the child sex ratio was 790, lower than the state average of 894. The literacy rate was 83.93%, higher than the state average of 82.34%, with male literacy at 90.63% and female literacy at 76.89%.

References

Villages in Washim district